Persuasive Peggy is a 1917 American silent comedy film directed by Charles Brabin and starring Peggy Hyland, William B. Davidson and Mary Cecil.

Cast
Peggy Hyland as Peggy Patton
William B. Davidson as Ed Trowbridge
Mary Cecil as Belle Newell
Gertrude Norman as Peggy's Mother
Charles Sutton as Peggy's Father
Jules Cowles as Head Farm Hand
Arthur Housman as Percy Pipp

References

External links

1917 comedy films
American silent feature films
Silent American comedy films
American black-and-white films
Films directed by Charles Brabin
1910s American films